Bang Saphan Noi is the southernmost district (amphoe) of Prachuap Khiri Khan province, central Thailand.

History
The minor district (king amphoe) Bang Saphan Noi was split off from Bang Saphan district on 10 June 1974. It was upgraded to a full district on 13 July 1981.

Etymology
The name Bang Saphan Noi originates from the time of the building of the southern railway. The workers had to build two bridges north and south of the railway station which later became the center of the district. As this was the same structure as for the Bang Saphan railway station further north, they thus named the railway station Bang Saphan Noi ('small bridge village'), and subsequently the railway station of Bang Saphan was named Bang Saphan Yai ('big bridge village').

Geography
Neighboring districts are Bang Saphan to the north, to the south the districts Tha Sae and Pathio of Chumphon province. To the west is the Tanintharyi Division of Myanmar, to the east, the Gulf of Thailand.

Environment
From 2002 to 2020, the district has lost 3,000 hectares of humid primary forest, a decrease of 16 percent.

Administration
The district is divided into five subdistricts (tambons), which are further subdivided into 41 villages (mubans). Bang Saphan Noi is also the only township (thesaban tambon) of the district, which covers parts of the tambon Bang Saphan. There are a further five tambon administrative organizations (TAO).

References

External links
amphoe.com 

Bang Saphan Noi